Xylota naknek  (Shannon, 1926), the  Naknek Leafwalker , is a fairly common species of syrphid fly observed across Canada and the Northeastern United States. Syrphid flies are also known as Hover Flies or Flower Flies because the adults are frequently found hovering around flowers from which they feed on nectar and pollen. The larvae of this genus live under bark in sap runs.

Distribution
Canada:British Columbia, Ontario, New Brunswick Nova Scotia, Manitoba, Quebec 
United States:Alaska, Wisconsin New Hampshire, California, Oregon, Washington, Minnesota.
[GBIF species page]

References

Eristalinae
Insects described in 1926
Diptera of North America
Hoverflies of North America
Taxa named by Raymond Corbett Shannon